Mary Adelaide Lundby (February 2, 1948 – January 17, 2009) was a state Senator from the Iowa's 18th District. She served in the Iowa Senate from 1995 to 2009, serving as Minority Leader from 2006 to 2007 and as Co-Majority Leader in 2006. She also served in the Iowa House of Representatives from 1987 to 1995, serving as Speaker pro Tempore from 1992 to 1994. Prior to her election to the Iowa House, Lundby had served as the co-chair of the Linn County Republican party, as a member of the Linn County Republican Central Committee, and as staff assistant to then-senator Roger Jepsen. She graduated from Upper Iowa University, majoring in Political Science and History.

Lundby served on several committees in the Iowa Senate - the Government Oversight committee; the Natural Resources and Environment committee; and the Rules and Administration committee.

Lundby was re-elected in 2004 with 20,686 votes (60%), defeating Democratic opponent Lorna Richards.  Lundby didn't run for re-election in 2008, opting to run for Linn County supervisor instead.  In June 2008, Lundby withdrew from the supervisor race, as her cancer had returned.

Lundby died on January 17, 2009, after a three-year battle with cervical cancer.

Her son, Daniel Lundby, was elected to the Iowa House of Representatives in 2012 as a Democrat.

References

External links
Iowa General Assembly - Senator Mary Lundby official government website
Project Vote Smart - Mary Adelaide Lundby profile
2006 2004 2002 2000 1998 campaign contributions
Iowa Senate Republicans - Mary Lundby profile

1948 births
2009 deaths
Deaths from cervical cancer
Republican Party Iowa state senators
Republican Party members of the Iowa House of Representatives
Women state legislators in Iowa
People from Carroll, Iowa
People from Marion, Iowa
Place of death missing
Upper Iowa University alumni
20th-century American politicians
20th-century American women politicians
21st-century American women